P4 (pe fyra) is a national radio channel produced by the Swedish public broadcaster Sveriges Radio.  P4 was started in 1987 as a network of regional stations, but national programming was added in 1993 when P3 was relaunched as a specialist youth channel and P4 took over a large part of P3's former programming intended for a more adult audience.

Programming
Targeted at an across-the-board audience, but with the emphasis on middle-aged (30+) listeners, it is the corporation's most popular radio channel, presenting popular music, entertainment, and sport. On weekdays most of the daytime schedule comes from 25 different regional stations, each producing programming (including local news coverage) for their own areas, while in the evenings and at weekends the channel carries national programming. Overnight (between 0.00 and 6.00) P4 and youth channel P3 present a joint programme of "music, games, and chat".

Among the more popular programmes broadcast nationally are: Karlavagnen, Melodikrysset, Ring så spelar vi, Sportextra and Svensktoppen.

Regional stations
The 25 regional stations are:
SR Blekinge
SR Dalarna
SR Gotland
SR Gävleborg
SR Göteborg
SR Halland
SR Jämtland
SR Jönköping
SR Kalmar
SR Kristianstad
SR Kronoberg
SR Malmö
SR Norrbotten
SR Sjuhärad
SR Skaraborg
SR Stockholm
SR Sörmland
SR Uppland
SR Värmland
SR Väst
SR Västerbotten
SR Västernorrland
SR Västmanland
SR Örebro
SR Östergötland

National presenters
 Åsa Avdic 
 Ulf Elfving
 Anders Eldeman 
 Patrik Ehrnst
 Pär Fontander
 Jenny Goldkuhl
 Gunnar Gramnes 
 Paul Haukka
 Annika Jankell
 Bosse Löthén
 Sanna Martin
 Carolina Norén
 Henrik Olsson
 Rickard Olsson
 Bosse Pettersson
 Marika Rennerfelt
 Hans Rosenfeldt
 Jesper J Rubin
 Peter Sundberg 
 Lisa Syrén
 Susanne Tellinger
 Tomas Tengby
 Andreas Tosting
 Stefan Wermelin

External links
Official site

Sveriges Radio
1987 establishments in Sweden
Radio stations established in 1987
Radio stations in Sweden
News and talk radio stations
Sports radio stations